Sarcophaga arno is a species of fly in the family Sarcophagidae. It is found in the  Afrotropical region.

References

Sarcophagidae
Insects described in 1934
Diptera of Africa